Roland St. George Tristram Harper (23 April 1907 – 24 April 1989) was a British hurdler. He competed in the men's 110 metres hurdles at the 1932 Summer Olympics. He also competed in the 120 yards hurdles at the 1930 British Empire Games for England. He was an accountant at the time of the 1930 Games.

References

1907 births
1989 deaths
Athletes (track and field) at the 1932 Summer Olympics
British male hurdlers
Olympic athletes of Great Britain
Athletes (track and field) at the 1930 British Empire Games
Athletes (track and field) at the 1934 British Empire Games
Commonwealth Games competitors for England
Place of birth missing